Alice Parker, a resident of Salem Town, Massachusetts, was executed on September 22, 1692, during the Salem Witch Trials.

The trial 
Martha Corey, Mary Eastey, Ann Pudeator, and Dorcas Hoar were convicted and sentenced to death by hanging at the same time, but Hoar was given a reprieve after confessing. Also hanged on that day were Mary (née Ayer) Parker and Samuel Wardwell. The Rev. Nicholas Noyes officiated. Mary Bradbury, an elderly woman (aged 77) who had been convicted of witchcraft, had also been sentenced to hang, but escaped. The charges against Alice Parker included the murder of Mary Warren's mother.

On May 12, 1692, Alice Parker was charged with a number of additional acts of witchcraft, including casting away Thomas Westgate and bewitching Mary Warren's sister. Margaret Jacobs also said she had seen her in North field in an apparition. Alice denied all accusations, and said she wished the earth could open and swallow her. She also asked for mercy from God.

Some sources note that Alice was the wife of local fisherman John Parker. There were several Parker families in the area which has resulted in some confusion.

References

Further reading

Upham, Charles (1980). Salem Witchcraft: New York: Frederick Ungar Publishing Co., 2vv., v.2 pp. 179–85, 324.

External links

 

1692 deaths
Year of birth unknown
17th-century executions of American people
People executed by the Massachusetts Bay Colony
People of the Salem witch trials
People executed by the Province of Massachusetts Bay
American people executed for witchcraft
People executed by the Thirteen Colonies by hanging
People executed by Massachusetts by hanging